Amherst is a town in Erie County, New York, United States. It is a suburb of Buffalo. As of 2020, the town had a total population of 129,595. This represents an increase from 122,366 as reported in the 2010 census.

The second largest in area and the most populous suburb of Buffalo, the town of Amherst encompasses the village of Williamsville as well as the hamlets of Eggertsville, Getzville, Snyder, Swormville, and East Amherst. The town is in the northern part of Erie County and borders a section of the Erie Canal.

Amherst is home to the north campus of the University at Buffalo, the graduate campus of Medaille College, a satellite campus of Bryant & Stratton College, and Daemen College.

History
The town of Amherst was created by the State of New York on April 10, 1818 from part of the town of Buffalo (later the city of Buffalo), which itself had previously been created from the town of Clarence. Amherst was named after Lord Jeffrey Amherst, commander-in-chief of the British army in North America from 1758 to 1763. Timothy S. Hopkins was elected the first supervisor of the town in 1819. Part of Amherst was later separated to form the town of Cheektowaga on March 22, 1839.

The opening of the Erie Canal in 1825 spurred Amherst's growth, bringing with it with new settlers and increased commerce. German immigrants settled in the northern part of the town as farmers, attracted by the fertile land in the area. The town's water resources encouraged the development of grist mills, saw mills, and other factories along Ellicott Creek. Several communities and hamlets started to develop around this time, such as Williamsville (1810s), Eggertsville and Snyder (1830s), East Amherst and Swormville (1850s), and Getzville (1860s).

Geography

Much of Amherst was originally floodplain and marshland, portions of which have been drained in recent years to facilitate development of new homes and businesses. The central and southern parts of the town are heavily suburbanized. Despite this development, the hamlets of Eggertsville and Snyder and the village of Williamsville have managed to retain much of their original character. The northern part of the town is still relatively undeveloped, with the prominent exception of the portions along Niagara Falls Boulevard (U.S. Route 62) bordering the towns of Tonawanda and Wheatfield. Some sections of northern and eastern Amherst have experienced problems with collapsing residential foundations as a result of unstable soil conditions. A few active farms may still be found in the northern part of the town.

Amherst is bordered on the north by Tonawanda Creek and Niagara County. Ellicott Creek flows through the town.

Adjacent cities and towns 
 Niagara County, Town of Pendleton - north
 Niagara County, City of North Tonawanda - northwest
 Town of Tonawanda - west
 City of Buffalo - southwest
 Town of Lancaster - southeast
 Town of Cheektowaga - south
 Town of Clarence - east

Neighborhoods 

Areas within Amherst are referred to by the former post office station names and are not legally incorporated. During the 1990s, many of these regional post offices were closed and consolidated into the central Amherst 14226 post office on Bailey Avenue, leaving only a Williamsville (14221) post office on Sheridan Drive, a Getzville (14068) post office on Millersport Highway, and an East Amherst (14051) post office on Transit Road. Mailing addresses to areas within the town are Amherst, East Amherst, Eggertsville, Getzville, Snyder, and Williamsville. These postal districts are still recognized by the post office and widely referred to by citizens.

Some of these mailing addresses overlap: some areas of Clarence directly east of Transit Road have Williamsville addresses, although for the purposes of taxes, schools and community resources, these people are residents of the Town of Clarence.

The areas listed below are governed and run by the Town of Amherst except for the Village of Williamsville, an independent political entity.

Eggertsville -- a hamlet in the southwest part of the town, bordering on Buffalo and centered around Eggert Road. Daemen College is located on Main Street (Route 5). The community is named after early postmaster Christian Eggert.
Getzville -- a location near the center of the town adjacent to Campbell Boulevard (Route 270) and Dodge Road. The name comes from early resident Joseph Getz.
Audubon - A location in the center of the town situated around John James Audubon Parkway. The town police, courthouse, and main library are located here.
East Amherst (formerly Transit Station) -- An unincorporated community, or hamlet, in the eastern part of the town, shared with the Town of Clarence. 
North Bailey -- A location at the junction of Bailey Avenue and Maple Road.
Snyder (originally Snyderville after postmaster Michael Snyder) -- A suburban community located between Eggertsville and the village of Williamsville.
Swormville - A hamlet in the eastern part of the town, shared with the Town of Clarence. Named for Adam Schworm, prominent landowner and businessman.
 Williamsville - an incorporated village within Amherst, located in the southern part of the town.

Climate 
Average high temperatures from May through October range from 60 to 81 degrees. Average high temperatures from November through March range from 31 to 47 degrees.

Demographics

As of the census of 2010, there were 122,366 people, 48,894 households, and 29,840 families residing in the town. There were 51,179 housing units. The racial makeup of the town was 83.8% White, 5.7% African American, 0.2% Native American, 7.9% Asian, 0.0% Pacific Islander, 0.5% from other races, and 1.8% from two or more races. Hispanic or Latino of any race were 2.3% of the population.

There were 48,894 households, out of which 26.0% had children under the age of 18 living with them, 49.4% were married couples living together, 8.9% had a female householder with no husband present, and 39.0% were non-families. 27.1% of all households were made up of individuals, and 31.6% had someone living alone who was 65 years of age or older. The average household size was 2.33 and the average family size was 2.98.

The median income for a household in the town was $55,427, and the median income for a family was $68,951. Males had a median income of $51,667 versus $32,030 for females. The per capita income for the town was $27,647. About 4.2% of families and 6.4% of the population were below the poverty line, including 6.6% of those under age 18 and 5.4% of those age 65 or over.

51.7% of residents (aged 25 and over) have obtained a Bachelor's degree or higher, including 26.7% with a Graduate or professional degree.

Economy 
In July 2010, CNNMoney ranked Amherst 42nd in a list of the Top 100 Best Places to Live in America. In 2012, CNNMoney.com ranked Amherst 50th. In 2011 and 2012, Amherst was selected as one of America's 100 Best Communities for Young People by America's Promise Alliance.

Arts and culture 
Many festivals are celebrated in Amherst throughout the year. The town is home to the Buffalo Niagara Heritage Village.

The Town of Amherst Archival Research Center is located in the Harlem Road Community Center, 4255 Harlem Road, Amherst NY 14226 (previously housed in the Former Reformed Mennonite Church which was listed on the National Register of Historic Places in 2003.)

Sports 

Amherst is home to the University at Buffalo Stadium, Alumni Arena, and Amherst Audubon Field, all utilized by the University at Buffalo Buffalo Bulls.

The Northtown Center is the town's ice hockey arena. The arena is the home of the Buffalo Beauts of the National Women's Hockey League, the University at Buffalo Bulls men's ice hockey team, and the Buffalo Wings, a professional inline hockey team competing in Major League Roller Hockey.

Government

Crime and public safety 

As of 2014, the Amherst Police Department employed 154 officers and 35 full and part-time civilian employees including the Chief, Assistant Chief, and eight captains.

Amherst has been ranked as the "Safest City in America" 1996–1998, 2000–2003, and 2010. In many other years it ranked in the top 5. The ranking is based on annual reports by the FBI, including crime statistics in six categories: murder, rape, robbery, aggravated assault, burglary, and auto theft.

In 2006, Amherst was ranked the second safest city in the United States, after Brick Township, New Jersey. In 2011, it ranked 6th safest out of 400 cities. Most recently in 2014, Amherst was ranked the #1 Safest City in America with a population between 100,000 and 500,000.

Education

Higher education 
There are five separate higher educational institutions with campuses in the town.
The North Campus of the University at Buffalo, a nationally ranked tier 1 research university.
All university programs apart from architecture, planning, nursing, dentistry, medicine, pharmacy, and public health reside here. 
Daemen University
One of three campuses of Erie Community College
Bryant and Stratton College
A satellite campus of Canisius College

Public schools
There are three separate public school districts within the town. 
Williamsville Central School District
The largest district and comprises the eastern half of the town along with portions of the Town of Clarence. The district is ranked #1 out of 97 public school systems in Western New York. Williamsville high schools were awarded Silver rankings according to 2013 U.S. News & World Report Best High Schools, and rank among the top 2-3% out of over 21,000 high schools nationally.  
Amherst Central School District
Covering the southwestern portion of the town with its core in the Eggertsville and Snyder areas.
Sweet Home Central School District 
Covering the northwestern portion of the town along with portions of the Town of Tonawanda with its core in West Amherst and Getzville.

Media 
Amherst is served by the Amherst Bee newspaper. In 1969 Paul Kurtz founded the publishing house Prometheus Books in Amherst.

Infrastructure 
  Interstate 90 (New York State Thruway) passes through the southern part of town.
 Interstate 290 (Youngmann Memorial Highway) travels through the town diagonally from I-90 to US 62 and beyond to Tonawanda
 Interstate 990 (Lockport Expressway), located entirely within the Town of Amherst, runs in a roughly north–south direction through the southwest and central part of Amherst until it ends at Millersport Highway (NY 263).
 U.S. Route 62 marks the western town line as Niagara Falls Boulevard as the route heads north, then as Sheridan Drive then Bailey Avenue heading south out of town.
 New York State Route 5 (Main Street) passes through the town.
 New York State Route 78 (Transit Road) marks the eastern town line.
 New York State Route 240 (Harlem Road) is a north–south road from Sheridan Drive (NY 324) south heading out of town.
 New York State Route 263 (Grover Cleveland Highway, Millersport Highway) is a north–south road from Bailey Avenue (US 62) to Transit Road. (NY 78). 
 New York State Route 270 (Campbell Boulevard) is a north–south road from Millersport Highway (NY 263) north out of town.
 New York State Route 277 (North Forest Road, Union Road) is a north–south road from Sheridan Drive (NY 324) south out of town.
 New York State Route 324 (Sheridan Drive) is an east–west road through the town from Niagara Falls Boulevard (US 62) east out of town.
Millard Filmore Suburban Hospital is located in the center of town on Maple Road.

Notable people

 Anita Álvarez, Olympic synchronized swimmer
 Eric Andersen, singer-songwriter, grew up in the hamlet of Snyder
 Scotty Bowman, former NHL coach
 Richard J. Burke, journalist, poet, and playwright
 Jack Davis, industrialist and politician
 Al Dekdebrun, former pro football quarterback and Amherst Town Supervisor
 Dan Gronkowski, former NFL tight end
 Rob Gronkowski, former NFL tight end for the New England Patriots and the Tampa Bay Buccaneers
 Jeffrey Gundlach, bond manager, graduated from Amherst High School
 Chris Hajt, former NHL player
 James P. Hayes, former New York state assemblyman
 Dan Herbeck, journalist for The Buffalo News
 Marc Evan Jackson, comedian
 Bruce Kershner, environmentalist
 Andy Kulberg, rock and blues bassist
 Nick Langworthy, chair of the New York Republican State Committee
 Wendie Malick, actress
 Norman McCombs, businessman
 Joe Mesi, professional boxer, attended Sweet Home High School
 Ian Murphy, alternative journalist and satirist
 Harry Neale, hockey broadcaster and former NHL coach
 Keith O'Neil, former NFL player
 Brooks Orpik, NHL defenseman
 Wayne Patrick, former NFL player
 Michael Ranzenhofer, New York state senator
 Edward Rath III, New York state senator
 Mike Robitaille, former NHL player and current Sabres broadcaster
 Mark Rubin, former NFL player
 Hugh B. Scott, judge
 Billy Sheehan, rock bassist
 Barnett Slepian, physician murdered by anti-abortion terrorist James Charles Kopp
 John Stevens, 2004 American Idol finalist
 Satish K. Tripathi, president of the State University of New York at Buffalo
 James Whitmore, actor, attended Amherst High School
 Gordon Yaeger, notable pilot of the Bell Rocket Belt
 Joe Mack, 2021 1st-round draft pick, playing catcher for the Miami Marlins

See also

List of Designated Historic Properties in Amherst, New York

References

External links

 
 Town of Amherst official website
 Town of Amherst charter

 New York Heritage - A History of the Town of Amherst, New York, 1818-1965

Buffalo–Niagara Falls metropolitan area
Towns in Erie County, New York